Baltic Storm is a 2003 film written and directed by Reuben Leder about the 1994 MS Estonia disaster. Based on the book Die Estonia: Tragödie eines Schiffsuntergangs by German journalist Jutta Rabe, the film focuses on the supposed transport of defense materials by the Swedish Armed Forces, and alleged cover-up of the true cause of the disaster.

Plot
The plot portrays the Swedish government as being responsible for using the ship to covertly transport Russian high-tech components to the United States. The story is uncovered by a young female journalist, not unlike Rabe herself. According to Rabe, divers hired by the Swedish government (signing contracts swearing lifetime secrecy) spent hours breaking into cabins frantically searching for a black attaché case carried by a Russian space technology dealer, Aleksandr Voronin (who died 2002). She highlighted US interest in various Soviet technology, including nuclear-powered satellites. She also suggested that panic about the stability of some form of nuclear device is the most likely reason behind the initial Swedish government suggestion of burying the wreck in concrete, a highly unusual proposal for a wreck, reminiscent of Chernobyl's sarcophagus.

Cast

External links

 

British thriller drama films
German thriller drama films
English-language German films
2003 films
Films set in Estonia
MS Estonia
Films based on non-fiction books
Films set in 1994
2000s thriller films
Films set in the Baltic Sea
Films about seafaring accidents or incidents
2000s English-language films
2000s British films
2000s German films